The 2013 Chicago Marathon was the 36th edition of the Chicago Marathon, held each year in Chicago, Illinois, and took place on Sunday, October 13. The elite races were won by Kenyan athletes Dennis Kipruto Kimetto (2:03:45) and Rita Jeptoo (2:19:57).

It had 39,122 finishers, (21,618 male, 17,504 female), and an average finishing time of 4:32:23.

Results

Men

Women

References

Results
Results. Association of Road Racing Statisticians. Retrieved 2020-04-07.

External links 
 Official website

Chicago Marathon
2010s in Chicago
2013 in Illinois
Chicago Marathon
Chicago
Mara
October 2013 sports events in the United States